The 1965 Arizona Wildcats football team represented the University of Arizona in the Western Athletic Conference (WAC) during the 1965 NCAA University Division football season.  In their seventh season under head coach Jim LaRue, the Wildcats compiled a 3–7 record (1–4 in WAC, last), and were outscored 172 to 77. Home games were played on campus at Arizona Stadium in Tucson, and the team captains were linebacker Tom Malloy, safety Woody King, and tackle Jim Pazerski,

Arizona's statistical leaders included Phil Albert with 559 passing yards, Brad Hubbert with 526 rushing yards, and Tim Plodinec with 191 receiving yards.

Schedule

Season notes
 Arizona scored 77 total points quarterbacks and only two touchdown passes by their quarterbacks in the entire season, mainly due to having an option offense at the time. The 77 points and the two passing touchdowns is claimed to be the fewest in a season for Arizona in its football history.
 The Wildcats began the season with the first three games on the road, which is believed to be the first time that Arizona started the season with at least three consecutive road games before playing their home opener.
 After their loss to Washington State (which would later become a future conference opponent for Arizona), the Wildcats finished the rest of the season without having to leave the state of Arizona, with four straight home games and the season finale on the road at Arizona State.
 The win over Texas Western (now known as Texas–El Paso or UTEP) was their only victory at home in the season, which prevented a winless home record.

References

External links
 Game program: Arizona vs. Washington State at Spokane – October 16, 1965

Arizona
Arizona Wildcats football seasons
Arizona Wildcats football